Yukon Gold may refer to:
 gold in the Yukon, see Geography of Yukon
 Yukon Gold Rush, gold rush in the Yukon
 Yukon Gold potato, a variety of potato
 Yukon Gold (1952 film), an American western film from 1952
 Yukon Gold (TV series), a 2013 reality show about gold mining in the Yukon